Intercity Direct is a Dutch higher-speed train service operating on the HSL-Zuid, connecting Amsterdam Centraal to Schiphol Airport, Rotterdam Centraal and Breda. Intercity Direct replaced the Fyra brand as of December 2013; it is part of NS International.

History
The Intercity Direct train service uses the HSL-Zuid which went into service 7 September 2009. An hourly domestic service branded Fyra by operator NS Hispeed was started on 7 September 2009 between Amsterdam and Rotterdam using TRAXX-locomotives and ICR-carriages. Initially the service was hourly and weekdays only. On 12 April 2010 service expanded to Saturdays and Sundays. As of 4 October 2010, frequency increased to twice hourly. Service was extended to Breda on 3 April 2011.

An international service also known as Fyra between Amsterdam and Brussels started 9 December 2012 using V250 rolling stock of AnsaldoBreda. From 17 January 2013 this service had to be pulled due to undercarriage damage caused by high velocity with ice and snow. As of June 2013 international Fyra service has been permanently suspended by both Dutch and Belgian railways.

Due to the perceived bad reputation of the Fyra brand, the domestic service rebranded into Intercity Direct as of December 2013.

The Traxx locomotives with ICRm carriages will be replaced by the new ICNG (Intercity New Generation) trains by 2023. The ICNG trains will be capable of operating at speeds up to 200 km/h.

Services

Intercity Direct offers the following services:

  2 trains per hour: Amsterdam Centraal - Schiphol Airport - Rotterdam Centraal – Breda (due to staff shortages temporarily not operating Rotterdam - Breda v.v.)
  2 trains per hour: Amsterdam Centraal - Schiphol Airport - Rotterdam Centraal
2 trains per hour: Den Haag Centraal - Rotterdam Centraal - Breda - Tilburg - Eindhoven Centraal
1 train per hour: Amsterdam Centraal - Schiphol Airport -  Rotterdam Centraal - Breda - Antwerpen Centraal - Brussels Zaventem Airport - Brussel Zuid/Midi (Intercity Brussel, also called "Beneluxtrein")

Supplement
A supplemental fare is required for any trip on the Intercity Direct that includes the Schiphol Airport–Rotterdam stretch. Single-use supplements cost €2.90 during peak hours and €1.74 during off-peak hours (2023) regardless of the class.

This supplement can be paid by touching an OV-Chipcard or Contactless payment to a "supplement pillar," which can be found on platforms from which Intercity Direct trains depart. These pillars are similar to OV-Chipcard validation machines, but contain a red "Toeslag" label. A bi-lingual sign indicates for which train the supplement is required. If the supplement was mistakenly paid, touching an OV-Chipcard to the same device within 30 seconds will cancel the purchase.

Journeys between Schiphol Airport railway station and Amsterdam Centraal, or between Rotterdam Centraal and Breda, can be made without paying the supplement. International tickets for the trains which continue to Belgium include the supplement in their cost.

References

External links
 Intercity Direct on the NS website
 Public transport route planner 9292

High-speed rail in the Netherlands